Prostitution in the Dominican Republic is legal, but related activities such as brothel-keeping or pimping are illegal. However, prostitution laws are generally not enforced. It is estimated that between 6,000 and 10,000 women work as prostitutes in the country, with many of the sex workers coming from neighboring Haiti. The population of illegal Haitian migrants in the country is particularly vulnerable to exploitation.

Sex Tourism
The Dominican Republic has gained a reputation of being a major destination for international sex tourism, although the activity is mostly concentrated in poor coastal towns (especially Las Terrenas, Cabarete, Sosua, and Boca Chica), where women have less economic opportunities than in larger towns and cities of the country. Haitian immigrants also take part in the sex tourism business, with many of the prostitutes in some areas being of Haitian descent. At sex tourism sites the lighter Dominicans are favored over darker Haitians, who are forced to work in the streets or local bars rather than the more lucrative up-scale areas. 

Underage prostitution is a problem, particularly in some urban areas within coastal towns, but there has been a decrease in child prostitution since 2001, with the increase in policing and the decrease in corruption. The United States Immigration and Customs Enforcement has started prosecuting individuals who are engaging in child prostitution. A 2015 study by the International Justice Mission found a quarter of sex workers working on the streets, in parks and on beaches were under 18 years old.

HIV

The prevalence of HIV/AIDS in the Dominican Republic is estimated to be 0.7 percent, which is relatively low by Caribbean standards. However, the percentage among sex workers is estimated to be much higher, ranging from 2.5% to 12.4%, depending on the locale.

Sex Trafficking

According to the US Department of State, the Dominican Republic is a source, transit and destination country for human trafficking. Women and children from neighboring Haiti are specially vulnerable to trafficking due to the prevalence of "Restavek" child slavery in Haitian culture, which affects approximately 300,000 Haitian children.

Women from other parts of the Caribbean, Asia, South America, and Eastern Europe to a lesser extent have also been known to be trafficked into the country for Forced prostitution. Colombian and Venezuelan women who had been brought into the country to dance in strip clubs are forced to work in prostitution in some tourist areas.

Dominican women are also subjected to sex trafficking within the island, the rest of the Caribbean, Europe, South and Central America, the Middle East, Asia and the United States. After the 2010 Haiti earthquake, some Dominican sex workers crossed over the border into Haiti, searching out clients amongst the aid workers and UN personnel. Dominican women are paid a premium because of their lighter skin.

The United States Department of State Office to Monitor and Combat Trafficking in Persons ranks the Dominican Republic as a 'Tier 2' country.

Sosua
According to a 1998 report in Sosua the women of this town usually have a choice to make a choice between working with locals or the tourist each having their own pros and cons. When working with locals compared to the tourists there is less risk and they are able to sustain a poor but stable lifestyle. However working with tourist and living outside of the local bars provides them with freedom away from the bar owners but they are put through financial stress to make the rent on their own. Sex tourism in the Dominican Republic can be viewed as more than an exchange of typical money for sex. Many of these sexual relations end up being more toward romance and these woman tend to refer to their regular clients as boyfriends. The relationships can end up being more than just about sex and can in turn become a relationship where these women gain financial gift or support from their regular clients. These women have little to no control over their clients but almost all are in search of a husband to better their livelihoods. Many of these women are in overcrowded homes with limited space plumbing and technology. Generally if a woman is capable of securing these men to the point where the men are providing these gifts on a consistent basis it would be considered "marriage" to these women. Many of these marriages are more like social contracts in a sense where the two individuals act as if they were married but no official papers. These woman tend to place these men on higher pedestals ignoring the wrongdoings these men may commit due to the fantasy of having the man that will treat them well. Many of these women enter this work in search of an official marriage despite the rumors of being pimped out by the European men due to the life style these men can provide and the hatred or superior complex over local men.

See also
Women in the Dominican Republic
Tourism in the Dominican Republic
Prostitution in Haiti

References

 
Society of the Dominican Republic